Paver or Pavers may refer to:

 Paver (flooring), a multi-shaped, multi-colored piece of brick, concrete or tile
 Paver (vehicle), a road construction vehicle
 Michelle Paver (born 1960), British writer
 Pavers Shoes

See also
 
 
 Pave (disambiguation)